Sabrina Ridge is a bare rock ridge between Sabrina Valley and Tamarus Valley, 5 miles (8 km) south of Derrick Peak in Britannia Range. Named in association with Britannia by a University of Waikato (N.Z.) geological party, 1978–79, led by Michael Selby. Sabrina is a historical name formerly used in Roman Britain for the River Severn.

External links 

 Sabrina Ridge on USGS website
 Sabrina Ridge on SCAR website
 Sabrina Ridge area map

References 

Ridges of Oates Land